Ambassador of Luck (1979–1994) was an American Thoroughbred racehorse who was voted the 1983 American Champion Older Female Horse. In her Championship season, she broke the stakes record in winning the Molly Pitcher Handicap at Monmouth Park Racetrack and equalled the stakes record when she won the Ballerina Stakes at Saratoga Race Course.

When her racing career was over Ambassador of Luck served as a broodmare, producing eight foals. One of her colts, Alydavid, sold as a weanling for $400,000.  Ambassador of Luck died on February 9, 1994, as a result of foaling complications.

References
 Ambassador of Luck's pedigree and partial racing stats
 January 8, 1984 article on Ambassador of Luck in the Toleda Blade

1979 racehorse births
1994 racehorse deaths
Thoroughbred family 23-b
Racehorses bred in Pennsylvania
Racehorses trained in the United States
Eclipse Award winners